General Asif Nawaz Janjua NI(M), HI(M), SBt, psc, (Urdu:  ; 3 January 1937 – 8 January 1993) was a senior officer of the Pakistan Army who served as the fourth Chief of Army Staff from 16 August 1991 until his death by Arsenic poisoning. His family commissioned a private test on hair from his brush, which was conducted in the United States. The test registered high levels of arsenic. As a result, his body was exhumed, and an autopsy was conducted by French, British, and American doctors. The cause of death was determined to be a heart attack, which can also be caused by exposure to low or mild levels of arsenic. Benazir Bhutto also believed he was murdered by political opponents, namely Nawaz Sharif.

His tenure is regarded as having stabilised the civilian control of the Pakistani military. He is one of four chiefs of staff who have died in office the others being Admiral Hasan Hafeez Ahmed in 1975, General Muhammad Zia-ul-Haq in 1988, and Air Chief Marshal Mushaf Ali Mir in 2002.

Biography

Early life, and between the Indo-Pakistani wars (1965–71)

Asif Nawaz Janjua was born in a small village, called Chakri Rajgan, which is located in the Jhelum District in Punjab in Pakistan into a Punjabi Janjua Rajput clan, on 31 January 1937. He was a military brat and his father, Raja Abdul Ghafoor Khan, had served as an officer in the British Indian Army, retiring at the rank of Major.

He was educated at the St Mary's Cambridge School in Murree Road in Rawalpindi. Two Irish teachers there who taught him the value of life and humanity, Father Francis and May Flanagan, had significant influence on his upbringing and future career. After his matriculation, he went to join the Pakistan Military Academy in 1954, and was one of very few cadets to be selected to attend the Royal Military Academy at Sandhurst in the United Kingdom. After completing his initial military training, he passed out from the academy in 1957 and was conferred the Sword of Honour by the academy's commandant.

Upon returning to Pakistan, 2nd-Lt. Janjua joined the 5th Sherdils Battalion of the Punjab Regiment on 31 March 1957.

In 1965, Captain Nawaz saw action in the second war with India in 1965 on the northern front. In 1970–71, Major Janjua was stationed with the Eastern Command in East-Pakistan, serving as a brigade major in the 111th Infantry Brigade. In 1971, Major Janjua fought in the third war with India in 1971 after taking over the command of his 5th Battalion and saw combat in the Chamb sector against the Indian Army.

After the third war with India in 1971, Major Janjua continued his military service and graduated from the Command and Staff College in Quetta, where he excelled in his studies. In 1976–77, Col. Janjua attended the National Defence University where he attained his MSc in War Studies.

War and command appointments in the military

In 1977, Brigadier Janjua was appointed as Chief of Staff of the II Corps stationed in Multan under the command of its field commander, Lt-Gen. M. Shariff. In 1982, he was promoted as two-star rank army general, and escaped from martial law appointments by President Zia-ul-Haq. From 1982 to 1985, Major-General Janjua was posted in Peshawar and served as the GOC of the 7th Infantry Division, posted with the XI Corps.

In 1985, Maj-Gen. Janjua was appointed as Commandant of the Pakistan Military Academy in Kakul which he served until 1988. In 1988, he was among the last army generals who were approved for the three-star rank promotion by Prime Minister Mohammad Junejo, and was appointed as Corps Commander of the Sindh-based V Corps by then-Chief of Army Staff Gen. Mirza Aslam Beg.

When General Nawaz took command of his Corps in Karachi it had begun to be embroiled in operations against MQM militants in the city. He would soon come to oversee law and order operations by his Corps in the disturbed city of Karachi. As V Corps was also responsible for security in all of Sindh, it had been embroiled in anti-dacoity and law and order operations in Sindh since the early 1980s. The province had destabilised in the wake of the anti-Zia-ul-Haq Movement for the Restoration of Democracy.

In April 1991, Lt-Gen. Janjua was moved to Rawalpindi when he was appointed at the Army GHQ as the Chief of General Staff (CGS), the second-in-command of the army, under the army chief Gen. Mirza Aslam Beg.

Chief of Army Staff

In 1991, Prime Minister Nawaz Sharif approved the timely retirement of Gen. Mirza Aslam Beg, and there were four senior army generals who were in the race for promotion to four-star appointment in the Pakistani military, included with seniority:

Lt-Gen. Asif Nawaz, the Chief of General Staff at the Army GHQ based in Rawalpindi.
Lt-Gen. Shamim Alam, the field commander of the XXXI Corps, stationed in Bahawalpur, Punjab in Pakistan.
Lt-Gen. Z.A. Naz, the field commander of the I Corps, stationed in Mangla, Punjab in Pakistan.
Lt-Gen. Hamid Gul,  the field commander of the II Corps, Multan, Punjab in Pakistan.

The senior most military officer in the military, Lt-Gen. Janjua's recommendation came from the former Chairman joint chiefs Gen.Rahimuddin Khan when the second most senior military officer, Lt-Gen. Shamim Alam was eventually elevated as the Chairman Joint Chiefs of Staff Committee. Lt-Gen. Janjua was confirmed to this four-star promotion by President Ghulam Ishaq Khan on 11 June 1991.

His command over the army came when the military embargo had been placed by the United States due to the suspicion about his country's clandestine atomic bomb program. Gen. Janjua immediately made a press release through the ISPR where he committed towards preventing military interference in national politics when he noted that the "army's image had been tarnished and its officers corrupted in Pakistan's 25 years of martial law." Gen. Janjua, who had pro-western views, worked together with Chairman joint chiefs Gen. Shamim and his JS HQ to improve bilateral relations between Pakistan and the United States when he agreed to deploy the combat brigades of the Pakistan Army in Somalia as part of the UN Mission to end the civil war in the country.

His political views reflected political liberalism and tried to improve the military-to-military relations with the Indian Army when he successfully took Pakistan out of what he saw as the dead-end policy of Islamism by former conservative President Zia. During Nawaz's tenure, the army took on the surprising role of becoming a protector of a free press and the liberal values of criticism.

As an army chief, Gen. Janjua played a crucial role in providing military aid to the civilian Government of Pakistan when he deployed the Pakistan Army Rangers to aid the Sindh Police against the dacoits and gangs in Karachi and rural Sindh.

Death and legacy
Janjua died on 8 January 1993, while he was jogging near his home in Rawalpindi. The death was ruled a heart attack, but his family commissioned a private test on hair from his brush, which was conducted in the United States. The test registered high levels of arsenic. As a result, his body was exhumed, and an autopsy was conducted by French, British, and American doctors. The cause of death was determined to be a heart attack; a heart attack can also be caused by exposure to low or mild levels of arsenic. The family had demonstrated suspicion due to previous mysterious deaths among prominent Pakistanis. There had also been reports of differences between then Prime Minister Nawaz Sharif and the Army Chief, especially with regard to the counterinsurgency operations that were being conducted in Karachi.

Nawaz was succeeded by General Abdul Waheed Kakar as the next Army Chief.

Legacy
Former Prime Minister Benazir Bhutto, then described Asif Nawaz as "a true professional soldier," and further stated that "he did what he said he would do – he kept the army out of politics." Unlike many of his predecessors, Asif Nawaz was incorruptible and often talked of how he would relax when he retired, unlike other generals who plunged into politics.

Awards and decorations

Further reading
 "Crossed Swords: Pakistan, Its Army, and the Wars Within (Oxford Pakistan Paperbacks)" by Shuja Nawaz, Publisher: Oxford University Press

References

External links
 Official profile at Pakistan Army website

|-

1937 births
1993 deaths
People from Jhelum
Government Gordon College alumni
Pakistan Military Academy alumni
Graduates of the Royal Military Academy Sandhurst
Punjab Regiment officers
Pakistani military personnel of the Indo-Pakistani War of 1971
Pakistani prisoners of war
National Defence University, Pakistan alumni
Academic staff of the National Defence University, Pakistan
Pakistani generals
Academic staff of Pakistan Military Academy
Chiefs of Army Staff, Pakistan
Pakistani democracy activists
People from Jhelum District
Punjabi people
Recipients of Nishan-e-Imtiaz
Recipients of Hilal-i-Imtiaz
Pakistan Command and Staff College alumni